Ghudchadi  is an upcoming Indian Hindi-language romantic comedy film written and directed by Binoy Gandhi. Produced by Nidhi Dutta, Bhushan Kumar and Krishan Kumar under the banner of Keep Dreaming Pictures and T-Series. It stars Sanjay Dutt and Raveena Tandon with Parth Samthaan, Khushali Kumar and Aruna Irani in pivotal roles.

Cast 
 Sanjay Dutt  
 Raveena Tandon 
 Parth Samthaan 
 Khushali Kumar
 Aruna Irani

Production 
The film was announced in mid-February 2022, starring Sanjay Dutt and Raveena Tandon. In the same month, Parth Samthaan, Khushali Kumar and Aruna Irani was confirmed to be a part of the cast.

The principal photography of the film began on 23 February 2022. The first schedule took place at Gurugram with an indoor shoot, followed by New Delhi and then moving on to Jaipur, Rajasthan and was completed within 19 days. The filming wrapped in November 2022.

References

External links 
 

Upcoming films
Upcoming Hindi-language films
Upcoming Indian films